The Battle of Blanquefort  took place on 1 November 1450 during the Hundred Years War when a French army drew out Anglo-Gascon forces from Bordeaux in the English-controlled Duchy of Gascony. The Anglo-Gascon infantry suffered heavy losses, and the battle resulted in a French decisive victory. The battle was known locally as La Male Journade or in French 
Mauvaise Journée and marked the beginning of a campaign to drive the English from Gascony.

References
Nicolle, David. The Fall of English France 1449–53. Bloomsbury Publishing, 2012. 

Battles of the Hundred Years' War
1450 in England
1450s in France
Conflicts in 1450
Hundred Years' War, 1415–1453
Gascony